Ames Lake is an unincorporated community and census-designated place (CDP) in King County, Washington, United States. The population was 1,486 at the 2010 census.

Based on per capita income, Ames Lake ranks 10th of 522 areas in the state of Washington to be ranked.

Geography
Ames Lake is located in northern King County at  (47.639081, -121.967131). The community surrounds a lake of the same name.

Demographics
As of the census of 2000, there were 1,435 people, 514 households, and 418 families residing in the CDP. The population density was 854.0 people per square mile (329.8/km2). There were 533 housing units at an average density of 317.2/sq mi (122.5/km2). The racial makeup of the CDP was 92.89% White, 0.07% African American, 0.21% Native American, 4.11% Asian, 0.14% Pacific Islander, 0.42% from other races, and 2.16% from two or more races. Hispanic or Latino of any race were 1.32% of the population.

There were 514 households, out of which 43.0% had children under the age of 18 living with them. 73.0% were married couples living together; 4.5% had a female householder with no husband present; and 18.5% were non-families. 12.3% of all households were made up of individuals, and 1.0% had someone living alone who was 65 years of age or older. The average household size was 2.79 and the average family size was 3.06.

In the CDP, the population was spread out, with 28.5% under the age of 18, 5.4% from 18 to 24, 39.1% from 25 to 44, 23.4% from 45 to 64, and 3.6% who were 65 years of age or older. The median age was 36 years. For every 100 females, there were 102.7 males. For every 100 females age 18 and over, there were 99.6 males.

The median income for a household in the CDP was $93,224, and the median income for a family was $96,679. Males had a median income of $67,500 versus $41,630 for females. The per capita income for the CDP was $49,863. None of the families and 3.3% of the population were living below the poverty line, including no under eighteens and none of those over 64.

Education
Most of Ames Lake is in Snoqualmie Valley School District, while a portion is in Riverview School District.

References

Census-designated places in King County, Washington
Census-designated places in Washington (state)